Zak Arogundade Gaterud, better known by his stage name Ecco2K, is a British-Swedish singer, designer, model, director and member of Drain Gang from Hornstull, Stockholm. Known for his experimental and innovative songwriting as well as his androgynous vocal style, he has also been celebrated for his directorial and design endeavours at the brand Eytys as well as for his own product line g'LOSS.

Artistry
Arogundade's music is a blend of experimental electronic, pop, and rap, often featuring adventurous vocal and production decisions that are outside the norm for these genres. In both his music and visual work, Arogundade focuses on themes of emotion and self discovery, presented through industrial and technological aesthetics.

His music video for "Peroxide" was filmed at the Lillgrund Wind Farm off the coast of Sweden.

Personal life
Ecco2K's father is Ben Arogundade, a British-Nigerian writer and designer. His paternal great-grandfather was the king of the Owu Kingdom from 1949 to 1972. His mother is a Swedish makeup artist. Arogundade was born in London, and grew up in the Hornstull neighbourhood of Stockholm from the age of 2.

His father taught him to use graphic software at a young age, something that he cites as the impetus for his creative work.

He started his first clothing label Alaska at the age of 16.

Arogundade is a member of Stockholm-based music group Drain Gang alongside rappers Bladee and Thaiboy Digital and producers Whitearmor and Yung Sherman.

Along with frequent collaborator Bladee, he formed the punk band Krossad in 2004, releasing an eleven track demo in 2007, and their last known show was 22 February 2008.

He holds an interest in football and supports Everton FC, an English football team from Liverpool that plays in the Premier League, as well as Inter Milan, an Italian football team from Milan that plays in the Serie A.

Discography

Albums
 E (2019)
 Crest (2022) (with Bladee)

Collaborative projects 
 GTBSG Compilation (2013) (with Thaiboy Digital, Bladee, Yung Lean, Whitearmor, Yung Sherman)
 D&G (2017) (with Bladee, Thaiboy Digital)
 Trash Island (2019) (with Bladee, Thaiboy Digital)
 Crest (2022) (with Bladee, Whitearmor)

EPs
 Crush Resist (CR_2015) (2015)
 PXE (2021)

References

Living people
Swedish male singer-songwriters
Swedish singer-songwriters
Swedish record producers
1994 births
Musicians from Stockholm
Swedish people of Nigerian descent
Swedish people of Yoruba descent
Yoruba musicians